Leo Anthony Gallagher Jr. (July 24, 1946 – November 11, 2022), known mononymously as Gallagher, was an American comedian who became one of the most recognizable comedic performers of the 1980s for his prop and observational routine that included the signature act of smashing a watermelon on stage with a wooden sledgehammer. For more than 30 years, he played between 100 and 200 shows a year, destroying tens of thousands of melons with the sledgehammer he called the "Sledge-O-Matic".  This last sketch was meant to poke fun at infomercials who peddled similarly inane products and whose popularity apexed in the late 70s/ early 80s before waning during the 90s.

Early life
Gallagher was born in Fort Bragg, North Carolina, on July 24, 1946, to a family of Irish and Croatian heritage. Until the age of nine, he lived in Lorain, Ohio, but because of his asthma, the family moved to South Tampa, Florida, where he attended Henry B. Plant High School. He went on to graduate from the University of South Florida with a chemical engineering degree in 1970. He minored in English literature.

Career
After college, Gallagher began working as comic/musician Jim Stafford's road manager. Stafford and Gallagher traveled to California in 1969, during which time Gallagher decided to perform as well. He began honing his own comedy act while frequenting both The Comedy Store and The Ice House. He performed twice on The Tonight Show when Johnny Carson was hosting, though Carson disliked prop comedy. He first appeared on the show on December 5, 1975, when he demonstrated his prop, "The Tonight Show Home Game", and again on May 9, 1979. He also performed several times on the show when guest hosts were filling in for Carson. Additionally, Gallagher made an appearance on The Mike Douglas Show, one on The Merv Griffin Show, and several at Playboy Clubs.

Gallagher's first comedy special, An Uncensored Evening, was the first comedy stand-up special ever to air on cable television. In contrast to other popular stand-up comics of the era who transitioned to sitcom and movie roles, Gallagher remained for the most part a touring comedian, and he once noted that he performed "200 shows a year for 35 years." Per Variety magazine, he did over 3,500 live shows over the course of his career.

Running for governor (as an independent) in the 2003 California gubernatorial recall election, Gallagher finished 16th out of 135 candidates with 5,466 votes.

Comedy style
Proclaiming himself the “Wizard of Odd,” Gallagher was known for "witty wordplay" and sharp observational comedy, but his signature act involved the use of the "Sledge-O-Matic", a large wooden mallet that he used to smash a variety of food items and other objects, culminating with a watermelon. His favored targets also included oranges, cottage cheese, pound cake, beans, cheeseburgers, tubes of toothpaste, video game controllers, and grapes. The Sledge-O-Matic act, an example of physical prop comedy, was a parody of the unintentionally humorous advertisements for the Ronco Veg-O-Matic, a kitchen tool that was heavily advertised on U.S. television from the mid-1960s through the 1970s. Gallagher's audiences were often issued ponchos, or knew to bring raincoats, to prepare for debris cast off into the audience. He dubbed the front row of his shows "Death Row". His show also featured a variety of props, including a large trampoline designed to look like a couch. Gallagher wrote his own jokes and toured with as many as 15 footlockers of props.

In July 1999, he performed a show in Cerritos, California, in which he used stereotypes that were considered offensive towards Mexicans. In January 2011, Gallagher walked out of comedian Marc Maron's WTF podcast when Maron continued to ask Gallagher about the controversial jokes after Gallagher had responded that, out of a two-to-three-hour show, there were only five jokes, which he had "heard on the street". In a subsequent interview that touched on the incident, Gallagher accused Maron of "taking the other side of everything". In subsequent years, Gallagher's routine was criticized for frequent homophobia, paranoid overtones, and racism.

In July 2012, Gallagher was featured in a television commercial for GEICO Insurance, repeating his Sledge-O-Matic routine.

Despite serious cardiac issues he experienced in his 60s and early 70s, Gallagher continued to tour until 2020, when the COVID-19 pandemic forced him to stop.

Sledge-O-Matic

Though it varied from performance to performance, Gallagher would usually end each of his shows with his signature "Sledge-O-Matic" routine.

It traditionally began with the following preamble:

Ladies and gentlemen! I did not come here tonight just to make you laugh. I came here to sell you something and I want you to pay particular attention!

The amazing Master Tool Corporation, a subsidiary of Fly-By-Night Industries, has entrusted who? Me! To show you! The handiest and the dandiest kitchen tool you've ever seen. And don't you wanna know how it works!?

Well, first you get out an ordinary apple. You place the apple between the patented pans. Then you reach for the tool that is not a slicer, is not a dicer, is not chopper in a hopper! What in the hell could it possibly be?! The Sledge-O-Matic!

Gallagher would then produce a large, usually wooden, mallet, roughly the size of a sledgehammer, and smash it down onto the apples, hurling chunks of produce into the audience. People in the first several rows were usually prepared to be splattered with umbrellas and raincoats. Fans called the experience “Gallagherizing”.

Audience injuries

Given the messy nature of his shows, on some occasions audience members sustained injuries during Gallagher's performances.

At a show at the Coach House in San Juan Capistrano, California, on September 29, 1990, a woman in the audience was struck on the head by a heavy plush penguin that had a fire extinguisher inside it. She later sued the comedian for $13,000 in medical bills, $20,000 in lost wages, and punitive damages reportedly in excess of $100,000. The case went to trial in 1993, with the jury ultimately siding with Gallagher, following a raucous trial where Gallagher took the stand and reportedly got as many laughs as he would during one of his shows. The presiding judge, William Froeberg, later said "... in seven years on the bench, I've seen a lot of characters, but none so theatrical ... It was entertaining. It certainly wasn't boring."

At a show at the Washington County Fair in Hillsboro, Oregon, on July 8, 2010, a woman rushed the stage, slipped on debris, and was taken to the hospital for her injuries.

Conflict with brother 
In the early 1990s, Gallagher's younger brother Ron asked him for permission to perform shows using Gallagher's trademark Sledge-O-Matic routine. Leo granted his permission on the condition that Ron, who shared a strong likeness to Leo, and his manager clarified in promotional materials that it was Ron Gallagher, not Leo Gallagher, who was performing. Ron typically performed in venues smaller than those in which Leo Gallagher performed. After several years, Ron began promoting his act as Gallagher Too or Gallagher Two. In some instances, Ron's act was promoted in a way that left unclear the fact that he was not the original Gallagher.

Leo initially responded by requesting only that his brother not use the Sledge-O-Matic routine. Ron nonetheless continued to tour as Gallagher Too using the routine. In August 2000, Leo sued his brother for trademark violations and false advertising. The courts ultimately sided with Leo, and granted an injunction prohibiting Ron from performing any act that impersonated his brother in small clubs and venues. This injunction also prohibited Ron from intentionally bearing likeness to Leo.

Legacy 
In 2004, Comedy Central rated Gallagher the 100th best stand-up comedian of all time. Gallagher was displeased with being ranked so low, and he told The Oregonian, "I looked at the other people and I was trying to find anyone I ever heard of. How could I be behind people I never heard of? ... I made 13 one-hour shows for Showtime, which are available on videotape. I invented the one-man show on cable."

Gallagher is portrayed by Paul F. Tompkins in the 2022 movie, Weird: The Al Yankovic Story.

Announcing his death on November 11, 2022, his manager said that while Gallagher had his detractors, "He was an undeniable talent and an American success story".

Scientific study 
In the 1980s, researchers at Loma Linda University used Gallagher's comedy to study laughter's effect on the body. Taking blood samples from ten medical students while they watched Gallagher in action, the researchers observed the subjects' white blood cells increasing. The scientists said that laughing appeared to have boosted their immune systems.

Personal life
Gallagher claimed that he lost nearly all of his fortune speculating on the stock market, and joked that he was "broke." However, his long-time manager disputed this as a bit of comedic exaggeration, adding, "We all need to be as broke as Leo."

During a performance on March 10, 2011, in Rochester, Minnesota, Gallagher collapsed on stage, clutching his chest. He was rushed to Saint Marys Hospital, where it was determined that he had suffered a minor heart attack.

A year later, on March 14, 2012, just before a performance in Lewisville, Texas, Gallagher began to experience intense chest pains. Gallagher's manager said the comic suffered a "mild to serious" heart attack and was placed in the hospital in a medically induced coma while doctors tried to determine what was wrong with his heart. After replacing two coronary stents, doctors slowly brought him out of the coma on March 18, 2012. He quickly recovered and started talking to his family. His manager, Christine Sherrer, stated that he was breathing on his own, moving, and telling jokes.

Gallagher died on November 11, 2022, in hospice care at his home in Palm Desert, California. The cause of death was organ failure from numerous heart attacks he suffered over the course of his life. He was 76.

Filmography

Comedy specials
 1980, An Uncensored Evening
 1981, Mad as Hell & Two Real 
 Totally New (1982)
 That's Stupid (1982)
 Stuck in the Sixties (1983)
 The Maddest (1983)
 Melon Crazy (1984)
 Over Your Head (1984)
 The Bookkeeper (1985)
 The Messiest (1986); contains clips from previous specials
 Overboard (1987)
 We Need a Hero (1992)
 Smashing Cheeseheads (1997)
 Messin' Up Texas (1998)
 Sledge-O-Matic.com (2000)
 Tropic of Gallagher (2007)
 Gotham Comedy Live (2014); episode "Gallagher" recorded on October 9 at the Gotham Club in Chelsea in New York City

Acting performances
 Record City (1978)
 The Smothers Brothers Comedy Hour (1988 TV series); 1 episode
 "Nontourage" (2010 short)
 The Book of Daniel (2013) as Astrologer-Abib

Other
 Match Game-Hollywood Squares Hour (1983) – game show participant / celebrity guest star 
 The Eric Andre Show (2013) – cameo 
 Celebrity Big Brother 2 (2019) – guest, performed Sledge-O-Matic routine for a Power of Veto Competition.

References

External links

 
 

1946 births
2022 deaths
20th-century American comedians
21st-century American comedians
American male comedians
American people of Croatian descent
American people of Irish descent
Deaths from multiple organ failure
Henry B. Plant High School alumni
Liberty Records artists
People from Fort Bragg, North Carolina
People from Lorain, Ohio
People from Tampa, Florida
Prop comics
University of South Florida alumni
United Artists Records artists